Deby may refer to:

 Idriss Déby (1952–2021), President of Chad and military officer
 Brahim Déby (1980–2007), son of Idriss Déby
Mahamat Déby Itno (b. 1983/1984), son of Idriss Déby
 Deby Callihan, American poker player
 Deby LaPlante (born 1953), American retired hurdler
 Dęby (disambiguation), various places in Poland